The following is a list of Northeastern Huskies football seasons.

Seasons

References

Northeastern Huskies
 
Northeastern Huskies football seasons